Alex Cordaz (born 1 January 1983) is an Italian professional footballer who plays as a goalkeeper for  club Inter Milan.

Career

Inter Milan
Cordaz started his career at Inter Milan. In the 2001–02 season, he was the regular selection ahead of Mathieu Moreau for first choice at Primavera Team (U20 team), where he won the championship.

When he turned 19, he was farmed out to Spezia of Serie C1. He played as the backup of Hugo Daniel Rubini.

In summer 2003, he returned to Inter as first team 3rd goalkeeper, while his ex-competitor Moreau was farmed out to Spezia. Cordaz made his first team debut against Juventus on 4 February 2004 in a Coppa Italia match which ended in a 2–2 draw.

He left for Spezia of Serie C1 again in January 2005. He won Coppa Italia Serie C along with Inter youth products Riccardo Meggiorini and Hernán Paolo Dellafiore, all of whom left on loan in January 2005.

He spent the 2005–06 season at Acireale of Serie C1 along with Devis Nossa and Fabrizio Biava. He was the first choice of the team, but missed the relegation playoff and Simone Deliperi played instead. Acireale were relegated after losing in the playoffs.

Treviso
On 31 August 2006, the last day of the transfer window, Cordaz was sold to newly relegated Treviso in a joint-ownership bid, for a peppercorn fee of €500. But he spent the first half of the season on loan at Pizzighettone of Serie C1. During the 2008–09 season Cordaz (€800,000 ca. January 2009) joined Treviso outright. January 2009 also saw the return of Gianluca Litteri (€50,000) and the signing of Samuele Longo and Mame Baba Thiam outright, which meant the deal involved little cash. Cordaz himself meant Inter had a financial income of €799,500 as the value of their retained half was increased from €500 to €800,000 in accounting.

Lugano
After Treviso disbanded due to financial issues, Cordaz found himself without a team, and later agreed for a move to Switzerland by joining Swiss Challenge League outfit FC Lugano on a free transfer.

Cittadella
On 5 July 2011, he returned to Serie B for Cittadella, replacing former Inter team-mate Simone Villanova.

Parma
In June 2013, Cordaz was signed by Parma on a free transfer. On 1 July 2013, he was farmed to Slovenian club ND Gorica along with Bright Addae, Daniele Bazzoffia, Uroš Celcer, Massimo Coda, Sebestyén Ihrig-Farkas, Alen Jogan, Gianluca Lapadula, Floriano Vanzo and Fabio Lebran (Crotone/Parma). The deals were finalized on 12 July.

In the first half of the 2014–15 season he failed to seek a new club, thus he became a backup keeper for Parma, despite wearing the no.1 shirt. On 9 January 2015, Cordaz left for Crotone, with Pavol Bajza returning to Parma. Cordaz also wore the number 1 shirt vacated by Bajza.

Crotone
On 8 July 2015, Cordaz signed a three-year contract with Crotone.

Return to Inter Milan
On 25 June 2021, it was announced that Cordaz had signed a one-year contract with Inter Milan.

Honours
Inter Milan Primavera
Campionato Nazionale Primavera: 2002

Spezia
Coppa Italia Serie C: 2005

Inter Milan
Coppa Italia: 2021–22 
Supercoppa Italiana: 2021, 2022

References

External links

Profile at the Inter Milan website
Profile at Swiss Football League 

Profile at Football.it 
Profile at Gazzetta 
PrvaLiga profile 

1983 births
Living people
People from Vittorio Veneto
Italian footballers
Association football goalkeepers
Serie A players
Serie B players
Swiss Challenge League players
Slovenian PrvaLiga players
Inter Milan players
Spezia Calcio players
Treviso F.B.C. 1993 players
A.S. Pizzighettone players
FC Lugano players
A.S. Cittadella players
Parma Calcio 1913 players
ND Gorica players
F.C. Crotone players
Italian expatriate footballers
Expatriate footballers in Switzerland
Italian expatriate sportspeople in Switzerland
Expatriate footballers in Slovenia
Italian expatriate sportspeople in Slovenia
Footballers from Veneto
Sportspeople from the Province of Treviso